Aro may refer to:

 Årø (Denmark), a small island in the Lillebælt in Denmark
 Aro (murderer) (died 1957), last person executed in Papua New Guinea
 Aro (surname)
 Aro (Twilight), a character in the Twilight saga by Stephenie Meyer
 Årø, Norway, a neighborhood of Molde
 Aro, Papua New Guinea, a village in Morobe Province
 Aro Confederacy, a precolonial Igbo trading oligarchy in West Africa
 Aro gTér, a lineage within Tibetan Buddhism
 Aro people, an Igbo subgroup in West Africa
 Aro River, a tributary of the Orinoco River in Venezuela
 Aro, a deity in Igbo mythology
 The abbreviation of aromantic, a lack of romantic orientation

ARO may refer to:
ARO (Auto Romania), a car company
Algonquin Radio Observatory, a radio telescope research facility in Ontario, Canada
Arctic Research Office, a division of the US NOAA
Army Research Office, a department of the United States Army Research Laboratory
Average rate option, a type of financial instrument
Asset retirement obligation, a financial liability which provides for future disposal of assets
Authentic Renewal Organization, a Venezuelan political party
ARO (building), one of the tallest buildings in New York City
Agricultural Research Organization, of the Israeli Ministry of Agriculture
ARO, Inc. (short for Arnold Research Organization), an American defense contractor
the former stock ticker symbol for Aéropostale
stage name for actress/musician Aimee Osbourne
The purchasing timeline After Receipt of Order
Air Traffic Services (ATS) Reporting Office, for pre- and post-flight briefing by pilots at an aerodrome

See also
 Aero (disambiguation)
 Årø (disambiguation)
 Aros (disambiguation)